Go Sagye (Hanyu Pinyin: Gāo Shèjī, ?~?) was a general of Goguryeo in 668 CE. He was taken captive by the Tang dynasty after Goguryeo's fall, and subsequently served as a general for the Tang before his son Gao Xianzhi succeeded him.

Background 
General Go Sagye was a distant relative of the Go Royal Family. Go became a general of Goguryeo from an unknown age and served under Bojang of Goguryeo.

Fall of Goguryeo and captured by Tang 
The Tang and Silla, a Korean kingdom, launched a major invasion of Goguryeo in 668. The Tang-Silla Alliance destroyed all major frontier fortress of Goguryeo. The Tang then bypassed Ansi fortress and headed straight for Pyongyang. At the same time, General Go was captured by Tang soldiers and taken captive.

After submission to Tang, he served briefly as a general in the Protectorate General to Pacify the West, where his son Gao Xianzhi was born and eventually succeeded him.

See also 
Goguryeo
Go Seonji
Dae Jung-sang

External links
Brief information about 고사계 (高舍鷄) at Encyber Dusan encyclopedia
Information about Go Sagye and Go Seonji

Goguryeo
Korean generals
Tang dynasty generals at war against Goguryeo
Year of death missing
Year of birth missing

ko:고사계
zh:高舍雞